Agriculture was the foundation of the Ancient Greek economy. Nearly 80% of the population  was involved in this activity.

Background
Most Greek language agricultural texts are lost, except two botany texts by Theophrastus and a poem by Hesiod. The main texts are mostly from the Roman Agronomists: Cato the Elder's De agri cultura, Columella's De re rustica, Marcus Terentius Varro and Palladius. Varro mentions at least fifty Greek authors whose works are now lost. Attributed to Mago the Carthaginian, the agricultural treatise Rusticatio, originally written in Punic and later translated into Greek and Latin, is now lost. Scholars speculate whether this text may have been an early source for agricultural traditions in the Near East and Classical world. Ancient Greek agronomy was also influenced by Babylonian agriculture through the work of 4th century writer Vindonius Anatolius who influenced the 7th century writer Cassianus Bassus. Bassus' Eclogae de re rustica was excerpted in the  Geoponika, a surviving Byzantine text created during the reign of Constantine VII Porphyrogenitus and later translated into Arabic, Syriac and Armenian.

Agricultural products

Farm 

During the early time of Greek history, as shown in the Odyssey, Greek agriculture - and diet - was based on cereals (sitos, though usually translated as wheat, could in fact designate any type of cereal grain).  Even if the ancients were aware of the better nutritional value of wheat, the growing of barley was less demanding and more productive. Attempts have been made to calculate Attica grain production in the period, but results have not been conclusive.         
It did not take long for demand to outpace production capabilities, as  arable land was limited. The "tightness" of the land ( / stenokhôría) also explains Greek colonization, and the importance Anatolian cleruchies would have for the Athenian empire in controlling grain provision.

On the other hand, the Greek land was well suited for olive trees, which provided olive oil. The growing of olive trees dates back to early Greek history. Olive plantations are a long-term investment: it takes more than twenty years for the tree to provide fruit, and it only fruits every other year. Grapes also do well in the rocky soil, but demand a lot of care. Grapes have been grown since the Bronze Age.

These core crops were augmented by vegetable gardens (cabbage, onion, garlic, lentils, chick pea, beans) and herb gardens (sage, mint, thyme, savory, oregano). Orchards included those of fig, almond, apple, and pear trees. Oil-seed plants such as linseed, sesame, and poppy were also grown.

Animal husbandry 

Animal husbandry, seen as a sign of power and wealth in the works of Homer, was in fact not well developed in ancient Greece. While the Mycenaean civilization was familiar with the rearing of cattle, the practice was restricted as a result of geographic expansion into less suitable terrain. Goats and sheep quickly became the most common livestock; less difficult to raise and providers of meat, wool, and milk (usually in the form of cheese). Pork and poultry (chicken and geese) were also raised. Oxen were rare and normally used as a work animal, though they were occasionally used as sacrificial animals (see Hecatomb).  Donkeys, mules and their mixes were raised as pack or draught animals.

Horses were raised on the plains of Thessaly and Argolis; it was a luxury animal, signifying aristocracy. The Clouds, Ancient Greek comedy by Aristophanes, illustrates the equestrian snobbery of Athenian aristocrats: Pheidippides, the son of the hero is addicted to race-horses and so ruins his father Strepsiades.

It is likely that most farms practiced some limited animal husbandry; poultry or small animals grazing on waste land or fed kitchen scraps.  Combined farm/livestock operations also existed, as well as those specializing in livestock. An inscription also mentions a certain Eubolos of Elateia, in Phocis, the owner of 220 head of cattle and horses and at least 1000 sheep and goats. Flocks of sheep were herded between the valley in winter and the mountains in summer. Taxes existed for the transit or stopover of flocks in cities.

Cows were also sometimes raised, although they were not as common as other farm animals.

Other products 
Wood was exploited, primarily for domestic use; homes and wagons were made of wood as was the ard (aratron). The Greek forests located in the highlands were denuded by goats and charcoal production; it was not long before it had to be imported especially for ship production (see trireme).

Beekeeping provided honey, the only source of sugar known to the Greeks. It also was used in medicines and in the production of mead. The  Ancient Greeks did not have access to sugarcane. The Hymettus region of Attica was known for the quality of honey produced there. Wax was also produced, used in the lost wax process to produce bronze statues as well as in medicines.

Bronze was used for farm tools and weaponry.

Agricultural work 

Hesiod's Works and Days, 8th century BCE and Xenophon's Economy of the 4th century BCE provide information about working off the land.

The olive harvest took place from late autumn to the beginning of winter, either by hand or by pole. They were placed in wicker baskets and left to ferment for a few weeks before being pressed. The screw press, although referred to as the Greek press by Pliny the Elder (XVIII, 37) was a late (2nd century BCE) Roman invention. Oil was preserved in terra cotta vases for use later. This was also the time for pruning of trees and vines and harvesting of legumes.

Spring was the rainy season; farmers took advantage of this to bring fallow ground back into production. They practised biennial crop rotation, alternating from year to year between fallow and cultivated. Attempts to introduce triennial crop rotation with legumes in the third year, ran into problems due to the poor Greek soil, lack of power, and absence of mechanization. The Greeks did not use animal manure, possibly due to the low number of cattle. The only soil additive was weeds ploughed back into the ground after fields came out of fallow.

In summer, irrigation was indispensable. In June, they harvested with sickles; the scythe was not used. Wheat was threshed with animal power; it was trampled by oxen, donkeys or mules, and the grain stored. Women and slaves ground it and made bread.

In early autumn, they collected deadfall and prepared supplies of firewood; while winters were mild on the coast they could be brutal in the highlands. Farmers also had to break the hard crust that had formed over the summer on grain fields. To do this required three passes since the ard was wooden (metal shares were rare) and only scratched the uppermost subsoil without inverting it. A hoe and mallet were also used to break clumps of earth. The fallow land for next year was sown by hand. This was the time of the grape harvest:  the grapes were crushed by foot in large vats, then the wine was left to ferment in jugs. After that process, people could drink the ambrosial wine and enjoy it.

In the nearly four centuries that passed between Hesiod and Xenophon, no improvements can be found in agriculture. Tools remained mediocre and there were no inventions to lighten the work of either man or animal. It was not until the rise of Romans that the water mill came into wide use, employing hydraulic power to augment muscle power. It took until the Middle Ages for true plows which turned the earth to be widely adopted. Neither irrigation, nor soil improvements, nor animal husbandry saw notable advances.  Only the very richest of land, such as that of Messinia was capable of supporting two crops per year.

Agricultural property 
With the exception of Athens, and a few areas where aerial surveys have permitted analysis of historical land distribution, agricultural property allocation is not well known.  Before the 5th century BCE, it is certain that the land belonged to great landowners, such as the Attican Eupatrides. Nevertheless, land use varied regionally; in Attica domains were divided among smaller plots, whereas in Thessaly they had single tenants.

From the 8th century BCE, tensions grew between the great landowners and the peasants, who were finding it more and more difficult to survive.  This can probably be explained by population growth brought on by reduced infant mortality, and aggravated by the practice of equally subdividing land amongst several inheritors each generation (attested to by both Homer and Hesiod).  In Athens, the crisis was resolved with the arrival of Solon in 594 BCE. He forbade slavery for debt and introduced other measures intended to help the peasants.  In the 5th century BCE, the practice of liturgy ( / leitourgia - literally, "public work") placed the responsibility for provision of public services heavily on the shoulders of the rich, and led to a reduction in large scale land ownership.  It is estimated that most citizens of hoplite rank owned around 5 hectares of land.  In Sparta, the reforms of Lycurgus led to a drastic redistribution of land, with 10 to 18 hectare lots (kleroi) distributed to each citizen. Elsewhere, tyrants undertook redistributions of land seized from wealthy political enemies.

From the 4th century BCE onwards property starts to become concentrated among few land owners, including in Sparta where according to Aristotle, the land has passed into the hands of a few (Politics, II, 1270a). Nevertheless, the aristocratic estates in Greece never achieved the scope of the great Roman latifundia; during the classical period, the wealthy  Alcibiades possessed only 28 hectares (Plato, 1 Alcibiades, 123c). In all cases, land remains intimately associated with the concept of wealth. The father of Demosthenes possessed 14 talents and for land owned only a home, but he was the exception. When the banker Pasion made his fortune, he hurried to buy land.

Some Greek land was public and/or sacred. Each city possessed such land and it is estimated that in Athens during the classical period these lands represented a tenth of cultivable land. This was an administrative division and the property of the city itself (for example in Attica, it was a deme) or a temple. These lands were leased to individuals.

See also 
 Diet of Ancient Greece
 Economy of Ancient Greece
 History of agriculture

Notes

Bibliography 

 Marie-Claire Amouretti :
  "L'agriculture de la Grèce antique. Bilan des recherches de la dernière décennie", Topoi. Orient-Occident, 4 (1994), p. 69–94,
  Le Pain et l'huile dans la Grèce antique. De l'araire au moulin, Belles Lettres, Paris, 1986 ;
  Anne-Marie Buttin, La Grèce classique, Belles Lettres, coll. "Guide Belles Lettres des civilisations", 2002 ;
  Marie-Claire Cauvin, Rites et rythmes agraires, Maison Orient-Méditerrannée, Lyon-Paris, 1991 ;
  Christophe Chandezon, L'élevage en Grèce (fin Ve - fin Ier S. a.C.): l'apport des sources épigraphiques..., Paris: De Boccard, 2003, 463 p..
  Moses Finley, Le Problème de la terre en Grèce ancienne, Mouton, Paris-La Haye, 1975 ;
 Signe Isager and Jens E. Skydsgaard, Ancient Greek Agriculture: An Introduction, Routledge, 1995 ;
 Léopold Migeotte :
  L'économie des cités grecques, Ellipses, coll. « Antiquité : une histoire », Paris, 2002,
 Léopold Migeotte :
  L'économie des cités grecques, Ellipses, coll. « Antiquité : une histoire », Paris, 2002,
  L'emprunt public dans les cités grecques. Recueil des documents et analyse critique, éditions du Sphinx et Belles Lettres, Québec-Paris, 1984 ;
  Claude Mossé, Annie Schnapp-Gourbeillon, Précis d'histoire grecque, Armand Colin, coll. « U », 2003 (2nd ed).

Further reading

Burford, Alison. Land and Labor In the Greek World. Baltimore: Johns Hopkins University Press, 1993.
Cole, Susan Guettel. "Demeter in the ancient Greek city and its countryside." In Placing the Gods: Sanctuaries and Sacred Space In Ancient Greece, edited by Susan E.Alcock and Robin Osborne, 199-216. Oxford: Clarendon Press, 1994.
Hodkinson, Stephen. "Animal husbandry in the Greek polis. Paper presented at the Ninth International Economic History Congress at Bern, August 1986." In Pastoral economies in classical Antiquity. Edited by Charles R. Whittaker, 35–74. Cambridge, UK: Cambridge Philological Society, 1988.
--. "Imperial democracy and market-oriented pastoral production in classical Athens." Anthropozoologica 16 (1992): 53–61.
Isager, Signe, and Jens Erik Skydsgaard. Ancient Greek Agriculture: An Introduction. 1st paperback ed. London: Routledge, 1995.
McHugh, Maeve. The Ancient Greek Farmstead. Oxford: Oxbow Books, 2017.

Economy of ancient Greece
Greece
Ancient Greece
Ancient Greece